The Korean Wave or Hallyu is a cultural phenomenon in which the global popularity of South Korean popular culture has dramatically risen since the 1990s. Worldwide interest in Korean culture has been led primarily by the spread of K-pop and K-dramas, with keystone successes including BoA, BTS, and PSY's "Gangnam Style", as well as Dae Jang Geum, Winter Sonata, and Squid Game. The Korean Wave has been recognized as a form of soft power and as an important economic asset for South Korea, generating revenue through both exports and tourism. 

Following the 1997 Asian financial crisis and the loosening of restrictions on the South Korean entertainment industry, South Korea emerged as a major exporter of popular culture. The Korean Wave was first driven by the spread of K-dramas and Korean cinema into China and parts of Southeast Asia, following the rise of satellite media in the late 1990s. Chinese journalists first coined the term "Korean Wave" in 1999 as hanliu, referring to the success of South Korean television in the country. During the 2000s, Hallyu evolved into a global phenomenon, expanding rapidly into South Asia, the Middle East, and Eastern Europe. By 2008, the value of cultural exports from South Korea surpassed the value of cultural imports for the first time. This expansion was fueled by the advent of social media and the internet, which played key roles in allowing the Korean entertainment industry reach overseas audiences, as well as the endorsement of the phenomenon by the South Korean government.

As a result of the Korean Wave, new critical attention has been brought to the Korean culture industry, including on the use of slave contracts in the idol industry and widespread sex trafficking in the Burning Sun scandal. A variety of programs and figures in the Korean entertainment industry have been criticized for racism, colorism, and misogyny, while a series of high-profile suicides by Korean actors highlighted the industry's harsh working conditions. In addition, Korean historical dramas have been increasingly scrutinized by Korean viewers for historical negationism and otherwise inaccurate portrayals of Korean history, leading to Snowdrop being boycotted and Joseon Exorcist being cancelled.

Etymology 
The term Hallyu is composed of two root words: han meaning "Korean" and ryu meaning "flow", "wave", or "trend". On 19 November 1999, the Beijing Youth Daily published the first known use of the term "Korean wave" in an article describing the "zeal of Chinese audiences for Korean TV dramas and pop songs." Other terms used at the time included "Korean tide," "Korean heat," and "Korean wind." The term entered common usage following the airing of the romance K-drama Winter Sonata, which was particularly successful in Japan.

Hallyu refers to the international diffusion of South Korean culture since the 1990s, following the end of military rule and the liberalization of the culture industry. The term primarily refers to the spread of Korean television, pop music, film, and fashion, but can also include animation, video games, technology, literature, cosmetics, and food. While the first generation of Hallyu in the late 1990s to early 2000s remained confined to Asia and referred to the popularity of Korean dramas and film on the continent, the second generation, or Hallyu 2.0, was driven primarily by the popularity of K-pop distributed on online platforms like YouTube. Both "Hallyu" and "Korean wave", were added to the Oxford English Dictionary in 2021.

First generation 
The first generation of the Korean Wave, also called Hallyu 1.0, refers to the initial rise in popularity of Korean popular culture within nearby Asian countries. The first generation began in China during the late 1990s, and consisted primarily of the spread of Korean television programming.

Background 
As a part of the decolonization process in South Korea, imports of all Japanese media were banned in 1945, and were not lifted until 1998 with the signing of the Japan–South Korea Joint Declaration of 1998. Despite this ban, Japanese media still steadily made its way into Korea, with both state broadcasters and individual bootleggers being found guilty of illegal importation. To prevent the South Korean culture industry from being supplanted by imports from Japan, the South Korean Ministry of Culture received a substantial budget increase, allowing for the creation of hundreds of culture industry departments in universities nationwide.

Television 
In 1990, the National Assembly granted a license to the regional Seoul Broadcasting System, becoming the first private television station since 1980, when military dictator Chun Doo-hwan forced the merger of 29 broadcasters into the state-owned Korean Broadcasting System and Munhwa Broadcasting Company. In December 1991, the National Assembly passed the Cable Television Act which directed the Ministry of Information to provide permits to twenty prospective cable television program providers. The providers would be selected in August 1993, and cable television services began in March, 1995. With the liberalization of the South Korean television market, a greater number of Korean programs started to be exported abroad. The 1997 broadcasts of the K-drama First Love and Star in My Heart in China are generally considered the start of the Korean Wave. Compounding the foreign interest in Korean television programs, countries throughout East Asia began opening their television markets to foreign countries in the 1980s and 1990s. In the early 1970s, imported television programs made up less than 1 percent of all airtime on China Central Television, while by the late 1990s, that number would rise to 20.30 percent In Vietnam, Korean television made up more than half of all imported programming in 1988.

The 1997 Asian financial crisis led broadcasters in East Asia to seek cheaper programs as an alternative to the expensive, but popular broadcasts from Japan. In 2000, K-dramas were a quarter of the price of Japanese television programs and a tenth of the price of Hong Kong television programs.

The 2003 historical K-drama Dae Jang Geum has been credited for having the greatest impact on the popularity of Korean television programs in Chinese-speaking countries, including Taiwan, Hong Kong, Singapore, and China. In May 2005, the show's final episode became the highest-rated television episode in Hong Kong history at more than 40 percent. In the years following its release, the program was exported to over 80 countries around the world. At the same time, the 2003–2004 airing of the romance K-drama Winter Sonata in Japan marked the entrance of the Korean Wave to Japan. Winter Sonata achieved a cult following in Japan among women in their 30s, particularly around the show's lead actor Bae Young-jun. This would lead Prime Minister Junichiro Koizumi to exclaim in 2004 that "Bae Yong-joon is more popular than I am in Japan." In the following years, tourism from Japan to South Korea would increase dramatically, primarily among women.

In the Indian state of Manipur, Hindi-language movies and television channels were banned in 2000 by insurgents, leading broadcasters to use Korean programming as substitutes. Korean dramas and films were also commonly smuggled into the region in the form of CDs and DVDs.

By the late 2000s, K-dramas became part of the daily programming of local television channels across East Asia and in China, Korean programs made up more than all other foreign programming combined. During the period between 1997 and 2007, television exports from South Korea would increase from $8.3 million to $151 million, mostly to other Asian markets. As the volume of Korean cultural imports rapidly increased, China's State Administration of Radio, Film, and Television responded with a decision to restrict and limit the number of Korean TV dramas shown to Chinese audiences. In Taiwan, the National Communications Commission asked cable channels to reduce the number of prime time hours allocated to Korean programming.

Film 
In 1966, military dictator Park Chung-hee established screen quotas that restricted the number of foreign films shown in cinemas, intended to protect the Korean film industry from Hollywood blockbusters. However, in 1986, the Motion Pictures Exporters Association of America filed a complaint to the United States Senate regarding the restrictions imposed by the South Korean government. Under US pressure and despite fierce opposition from the domestic film industry, in 1988, the Korean government lifted restrictions that required foreign films to be distributed by domestic companies. In 1988, 20th Century Fox became the first American film studio to set up a distribution office in South Korea, followed by Warner Brothers in 1989, Columbia in 1990, and Disney in 1993. By 1994, domestic films reached a record low market share of just 15.4 percent, with commentators predicting the demise of the Korean film industry in the near-future. As well, negotiations for the Uruguay Round Agreements Act concluded in 1994, requiring South Korea to liberalize its communications and culture markets.

In response to these crises, the National Assembly instituted the Cultural Industry Bureau within the Ministry of Culture and Sports and passed the Motion Picture Promotion Law in 1995, providing tax incentives for film production. These incentives were successful in attracting a number of chaebols to the film industry, but these ventures remained financially unsuccessful, mostly disbanding following the 1997 Asian financial crisis. In January 1999, the Samsung Entertainment Group announced its dissolution and released its final film Shiri in February of that year. But despite the withdrawal of Samsung from the industry, Shiri set box office records in South Korea and achieved commercial success in Hong Kong and Japan, a rare feat for the time. Shiri had been funded partly through venture capital, and the success of the film led to a 1999 revision of the Motion Picture Promotion Law to allow individuals to finance film productions. This influx of capital would fund hundreds of Korean films and dramatically increase their budgets, with average costs per production rising from 0.9 billion won in 1995 to 42 billion won in 2004.

Music 

The debuts of TVXQ in 2003, SS501 and Super Junior in 2005, and the early success of BigBang in 2006 were major breakthroughs for K-pop in Asia. In 2003, the South Korean girl group Baby V.O.X. released the Chinese-language single "I'm Still Loving You" to widespread popularity in China and Thailand.

During the 2008 fiscal year, 68 percent of all K-pop exports from South Korea were exported to Japan.

Second generation 

Hallyu 2.0 or the New Korean Wave refers to the second generation of the Korean Wave, beginning in 2008. This generation is characterized by the spread of Korean popular culture through social media and the transition to K-pop as the primary South Korean cultural export. The period marked the rapid expansion of the South Korean music, animation, and online gaming industries and a shift in government policy, from indifference to enthusiastic support, under the Lee Myung-bak and Park Geun-hye administrations. The mid-2000s marked the expansion of the Korean Wave outside of East Asia into other parts of Asia, while the mid-2010s marked the Korean Wave's expansion outside of Asia into Europe, the Americas, and Africa. The rise of social media has played a key role in the growth of the Korean Wave in this era.

Since the mid-2010s, the rising success of K-pop groups abroad, including the rise of the boy band BTS from relative obscurity, have become characteristic of the Korean Wave. According to a poll conducted by the Ministry of Culture, Sports and Tourism during the Covid-19 pandemic, BTS, Blackpink, and Psy were the three most popular K-pop acts internationally, while Crash Landing on You, It's Okay to Not Be Okay, and The World of the Married were the three most popular television programs internationally.

In the United States, the Korean Wave spread outwards from Korean-American communities, most notably in New York City and Los Angeles.

Since September 2022, the Victoria and Albert Museum has hosted the exhibition "Hallyu! The Korean Wave," showcasing the history of the Korean Wave in fashion, music, dance, and art. Min Jin Lee, the author of the novel Pachinko, credited the Korean Wave for her success.

Government policy 
The success of South Korean cultural products during the beginning of the 21st century has led some governments in Asia to pass measures to protect their own cultural industries. Japan, China, and Taiwan made specific efforts to stem the flow of Korean films and dramas into their countries, which caused those films and dramas to suffer in sales. This necessitated Korea's finding new markets in which to export their cultural products. K-pop and Korean idols have been a core part of Hallyu 2.0 finding these new markets.

Much Korean investment in arts and culture prior to 1993 focused on traditional forms of Korean culture that were essential to hold on to given the turbulence of the 20th century in Korean history. After 1993, cultural commercialization became government policy as leaders saw the necessity of integrating culture and economy. In 1999, the "Basic Law for Promoting Cultural Industries" was passed by the Korean government, establishing government support for "co-production with foreign countries, marketing and advertising of Korean pop culture through broadcasting and the Internet, and the dissemination of domestic cultural products to foreign markets". Establishing their clear and public support for cultural industries, however, caused antagonism in other Asian countries, which were, at the time, the primary market for Korea's cultural exports. Therefore, indirect support had to be practiced. In 2008, the budget for the cultural industries sector increased, and the government introduced the "creative content industry", emphasizing K-pop and video games as important foreign exports.

The Internet 
Since the 2000s, the Korean Wave has transformed from a phenomenon driven primarily by satellite broadcasts to one driven by social media and the Internet. Foreign-language subtitles of K-dramas and real-time translations of K-pop performances on the Internet broadened the scope of Korean pop culture.

In 2012, views of the top 200 K-pop artists on YouTube tripled and by 2016 reached a cumulative cumulative 24 billion views, with the vast majority of these views coming from outside of South Korea. YouTube has enabled fans to connect with K-pop through their own content, such as dance covers and reaction videos/channels. The creation of remakes on YouTube acted as consumer-generated advertising and helped propel the virality of "Gangnam Style."

Music 
Psy's music video for "Gangnam Style" went viral in 2012 and by December became the first YouTube video to reach one billion views. YouTube and other online video platforms have been vital in the increasing international popularity of K-pop.

BTS and other groups have had sustained success globally, with world tours and appearances at US Billboard Music Awards and other foreign events. BTS won four Billboard Music Awards and three American Music Awards. They were nominated for performance in Grammy Awards. BTS sold out four concerts at SoFi Stadium in Los Angeles from November 27 to December 1, 2021. Since the 2010s, there have been a greater number of collaborations between K-pop and foreign artists, such as BTS with Steve Aoki and Psy with Snoop Dogg.

For many artists, domestic popularity no longer correlate to overall success as Japan, India, Indonesia, Thailand, Philippines, Mexico, Brazil and the United States surpassed South Korea in consumption pattern. Agencies are also shifting their focus to entice global fans. From 23 nations till 2012, K-pop CDs are now exported to 88 nations, generating ₩270.3 billion ($222 million) in 2021.

Globalization of K-pop started attracting talents from around the world. K-pop bands in the past involved non-Korean members but are mostly from East and Southeast Asian region with an exception to Western countries hosting large Korean diaspora such as the United States. 

As per Circle Chart, sales and digital streaming is at all time high for the Top 400 K-pop Albums during the first half of 2022 due to overseas fandom. YouTube views, considered an important measure for K-pop popularity is dominated by India, Indonesia, the Philippines, Thailand and Vietnam. Korean dance studios are now in high demand and attracting applicants from abroad. Middle-eastern and African regions are the new emerging market. India registered 1,000 percent increase in K-pop viewership on YouTube from 2019 to 2022 followed by 167.6 percent rise in Japan, and 55.6 percent increase in the US.

Television 
Since the mid-2000s, the three major South Korean broadcast television networks, KBS, MBC, and SBS, have faced increasing competition from comprehensive television networks that have integrated production teams.

The 2006 historical K-drama Jumong was hugely successful in Turkey, Romania, and Iran, where it achieved nationwide ratings of 80 to 90 percent.

Kingdom became a huge hit that led to the release of second season in India by Netflix. As per Black Kettle Studio, K-dramas are popular among Indian women across age groups. In 2020, there is consolidation of Korean Wave in Indian entertainment market that is no longer viewed as fad. Korean content positively connected Indian audience.

In 2021, Netflix spent $500 million on movies and TV series in South Korea, which is the third-largest market based on sales figures. From 2015 to 2020, Netflix spent $700 million on Korean entertainment business which include partnership with Studio Dragon and CJ Entertainment.

Film 
Korean movies in Hallyu's first generation were primarily consumed in other Asian countries until recent years. In particular, Korean entertainment has reached the mainstream Western film industry in newer ways, such as through Netflix, a leader in movie and television show streaming. In 2017, Korean director Bong Joon-ho created the Netflix original movie, Okja funded by Netflix. Bong Joon-ho also directed the dark comedy thriller movie Parasite, which won several awards at international film festivals. Parasite made history by winning two Academy Awards in 2020 for Best Picture and Best International Film. Heavy demand for Korean content and COVID-19 pandemic pushed science fiction movie Space Sweepers to be released exclusively on Netflix in 2021. Foreign filmmakers are now more inclined to co-produce or create local production in South Korea. Female talent of South Korea impressed Mike Figgis as he ventured into Korean filmmaking. Globalization of Hallyu increased the demand of Korean talent.

Manhwa 
Manhwa, the Korean term for comics, first gained popularity outside of Korea during the early 2000s. During the 2010s, the format would undergo a revitalization as a result of webtoons, which provided the format a smartphone-optizimized layout and room to skirt South Korea's censorship standards. Thanks to webtoons, many Korean companies such as Naver, Kakao, Lezhin and others have expanded globally and have begun to offer their titles in different languages and the global success of certain titles has led to the creation of film, television, and animated adaptations of them.

Cosmetics 
Korean skin care products have gained widespread popularity in Asia. Amorepacific and LG Household & Health Care have become the top two beauty companies in the Asia-Pacific region. China has become the largest market for Korean cosmetics, and South Korea accounts for 25% of China's cosmetic imports. In Sri Lanka, European beauty products have largely been replaced in favor of Korean cosmetic and skincare products which have become popular because of their cheaper prices and their suitability for Asian skin. Similarly, Korean products have become popular in Singapore because they meet the concerns of Asians and that they have been designed for Asian people. The popularity of K-pop in Cambodia has also led to the influx of Korean beauty products into the Cambodian market.

Fan clubs 

According to a 2011 survey conducted by the South Korean Ministry of Culture, Sports and Tourism, the total number of active members of Hallyu fan clubs worldwide was estimated at 3.3 million, based on statistics published by official fan clubs in regions where there are Korean Cultural Centers. In the same year, the Korea Tourism Organization surveyed 12,085 fans of Hallyu and concluded that most fans were young adults, over 90% were female, and most were fans of K-pop. According to the Korea Foundation, in 2018 there were about 89 million fans of 'Hallyu' around the world, and 1,843 fan clubs. The number of fans grew by 22% from the year before, which is largely attributed to the growing popularity of boy band BTS. As of December 2019, there were 1,799 Hallyu fan clubs with 99.32 million fans, leading by K-pop followed by Korean dramas. According to The Korea Foundation, fans were based in Asia and Oceania at around 72 million, followed by 15 million in Europe and 12 million in the Americas. As of September 2020, in 98 countries there are 1,835 fan clubs and a total of 104 million members as per data from the Korea Foundation. During COVID-19 pandemic, the Korean Wave expanded to Africa, Europe and West Asia while the US saw a 30% jump in fan base from 2019 which now stands at 15.8 million. There is also decline mainly in China and Japan. Korean popular culture is now recognized in 109 countries due to Academy Award-winning movie, Parasite. Europe saw a 25% increase in fans from 15 million to 18.8 million. Africa and West Asia account for 1.19 million fans. From 270,000 in 2020 to 15 million in 2021 as per Facebook Analytics, the number of Hallyu fans increased by 54 times in India, making it the sixth largest K-pop market in the world.

Foreign relations

East Asia

China 

Many Chinese officials, including former paramount leader Hu Jintao and former Premier Wen Jiabao have expressed support for the spread of Korean media and entertainment within China.

In 2013, four Seoul National University research students published a controversial report suggesting that Chinese viewers of Korean dramas were less educated and had lower incomes than viewers of programs from other countries.  In response, one group purchased a full-page advertisement in the Chosun Ilbo requesting an apology from the study authors.

Throughout 2016 and 2017, China implemented various restrictions on Korean cultural and economic imports as retaliation for the installation of the THAAD missile defense system, which it considers a risk to its national security. During this time, many Chinese-Korean television productions were paused and Korean television programs, the streaming of K-pop videos, and imports of various Korean cosmetics were restricted by the government. A number of Korean artists had their visas denied and appearances canceled, although the Chinese government officially stated that their visa policy had not changed. In March 2017, the China National Tourism Administration issued a ban on group tours to South Korea by Chinese travel agencies. These bans resulted in significant financial losses for the South Korean entertainment industry with share prices of SM Entertainment falling 18 percent, a loss of $150 million, and share prices of YG Entertainment falling 32 percent, a loss of $230 million. On 31 October 2017, the two governments annnounced a settlement regarding the THAAD dispute. Following the agreement, many large Chinese online video platforms began importing Korean dramas again, Chinese travel agencies restarted group tours to South Korea, and Korean bands made appearances Chinese TV shows.

Taiwan 

In the early 1990s, Korean TV dramas entered the Taiwanese market but they didn't gain wide popularity. Local broadcasting channel GTV began to broadcast Korean television dramas in the late 1990s. The shows were dubbed into Mandarin and were not marketed as foreign, which may have helped them to become widely popular during this time. The spread of Korean popular culture has been described as the "invasion of Korean Wave" by Taiwanese media outlets. Following the 1997 Asian financial crisis, Taiwanese broadcasters replaced popular Japanese soap operas with K-dramas, which were a cheaper alternative. It was a reversal in the Taiwanese entertainment market because Japan and Hong Kong had maintained stable relationships with Taiwan for cultural exchange for centuries, whereas South Korea was regarded negatively by Taiwanese, especially after South Korea readjusted the relationship with Taiwan and established a new relationship with mainland China since 1992. The boom of the Korean Wave changed Taiwanese perspectives on South Korea and improved the relationship between Taiwan and South Korea. Taiwanese TV stations gradually imported Korean TV series, such as Dae Jang Geum, one of the most famous series.

Japan 
The Korean Wave in Japan, also referred to as hanryu or kanryu , decidedly began with the airings of the romance K-drama Winter Sonata in 2003 and 2004 which achieved a cult following within the country. However, the foundations for the wave were built on earlier travel trends, food culture, the beauty industry, and the joint hosting of the FIFA World Cup in 2002. Korean actor Bae Yong-joon, also known in Japan a Yon-sama, was the early face of the wave, generating an economic burst as Japanese viewers rushed to buy the DVD of Winter Sonata, along with DVD players and related accessories. Early reporting of the popularity of Yon-sama included derogatory remarks about his female fan base in Japan, labeling them as sex-deprived "hags." However, the buying power of the Yon-sama fan base could not be ignored. Winter Sonata-themed beverages, foods, accessories, beauty products, and more sold out in Japan. Other Korean TV series soon followed, such as Jewel in the Palace. The Japanese fan base easily recognized and connected historical Chinese elements present in the shows, such as calligraphy, and imperial court intrigues. Japanese women also connected to the comforting, communicative character played by Yon-sama. Since the arrival of the Korean Wave, Korean cuisine and products have increased in Japan. Shin-Okubo Station in Tokyo, known for its Korean neighborhood, has since become featured in Japanese tourist brochures.

As a result of the Korean Wave, some hoped political tensions between Japan and South Korean may improve. Some effort has been taken to avoid tense associations, resulting in the adoption of the term koria from English "Korea" rather than using the politically charged term for Korea, kankoku. However, the overall effect has been limited.

The Japanese Ministry of Foreign Affairs acknowledges that the Korean Wave in Japan has led to discussion and mutual cultural exchange between the two countries, with high-profile fans of Korean television including former First Ladies Miyuki Hatoyama and Akie Abe. However, remaining tension between Japan and Korea has led to instances of street protests involving hundreds of people, demonstrating against the popularity of Korean entertainment exports. These protests were mostly organized by critics of K-pop culture with the support of right-wing nationalists.

Still, the Japanese Cabinet Office survey in 2004 found that favorable feelings towards South Korea rose to 56.7% a three-year record high in Japan.

The worldwide popularity of Japanese movies, and pop music was overtaken by their Korean counterparts around 2010. This has been attributed to Korea's puritanical culture ("K-pop groups look and act like real adults, whereas J-Pop outfits often emphasize adolescent cuteness"), K-pop being continually influenced by American and European trends while J-pop remains static, the K-pop industry's control of talent recruitment and distribution, K-pop's embrace of social media such as YouTube while J-pop producers frequently shut down unauthorized clips on that site, and the "Japan Galapagos Syndrome" where many recent products are designed only for the Japanese domestic market while lacking worldwide appeal.

South Asia

Afghanistan 
In a 2021 statement, the Afghan Deputy Foreign Minister for Political Affairs Meerwais Nab noted the popularity of K-dramas in the country while expressing hope for cultural exchange between the two countries.

Bangladesh 
Netflix entering the Bangladesh streaming market acted as a catalyst that helped popularize the Korean Wave among larger audiences. Since then, Netflix became the go-to platform to watch Korean dramas. Facebook also saw a constant rise in Bangladeshi fan groups of K-pop and K-drama.

As a result of the Korean Wave, stores selling South Korean beauty products, clothes, and food have opened in Dhaka and Chittagong. There is also a rise in demand to visit South Korea. Korean specialized restaurants are opening up around major locations selling Korean barbecue, grilled beef, bulgogi and kimchi. Unlike in India or the West, the more conservative section of society did not view South Korean culture or the Korean Wave as negative. Local entrepreneurs started cashing in on an increased demand for Korean cosmetics.

India 
The Korean Wave first entered India in the northeastern region of the country, and was accelerated by the ban on Hindi language media by the People's Liberation Army of Manipur in Manipur in 2000. The release of PSY's "Gangnam Style" in 2012 pushed K-pop into mainstream Indian culture.

In 2018, during a banquet hosted for South Korean President Moon Jae-in at the Rashtrapati Bhavan, President Ram Nath Kovind affirmed the popularity of Korean culture in the country.

During the Covid-19 pandemic in India, streaming services in India saw a dramatic rise in interest for Korean-language programming. Product placement, a common feature of K-dramas, has fueled interest in India into a variety of brands featured on these shows.

Korean fashion, music, and television have been adopted by teenagers in Kashmir, despite concerns by older generations over the erasure of traditional 
Kashmiri culture. In addition, K-pop and K-pop idols have been criticized for promoting unhealthy attitudes around weight in Indian adolescents.

Middle East and North Africa 

Since the mid-2000s, Israel, Iran, Morocco and Egypt have become major consumers of Korean culture. Following the success of Korean dramas in the Middle East & North Africa, the Korean Overseas Information Service made Winter Sonata available with Arabic subtitles on several state-run Egyptian television networks. According to Youna Kim (2007), "The broadcast was part of the government's efforts to improve the image of South Korea in the Middle East, where there is little understanding and exposure towards Korean culture" (p. 31). The New York Times reported that the intent behind this was to contribute towards positive relations between Arab & Berber audiences and South Korean soldiers stationed in northern Iraq.

MBC4 (Middle East Broadcasting Channel) played a major role in increasing the Korean Wave's popularity in the MENA region (Middle East and North Africa). This broadcasting channel hosted a series of Korean drama starting 2013 such as Boys Over Flowers (أيام الزهور), You're Beautiful (أنت جميلة), Dream High (حلم الشباب ) and Coffee Prince ( مقهى الأمير). Some Arab countries opposed Korean shows (dramas and reality TV shows) because of the fear they would lead to Islamic youth to abandon their traditions wholesale to adopt Western modernity wholesale. However, this did not stop the Korean industries from exporting more Korean Dramas to the Arab world in the following years such as The Heirs ( الورثة).

The popularity of Korean dramas in the MENA region-and its continuous growth- originates from the content of these dramas. As the majority of the plots of Korean dramas focus on social issues (love between different social classes or family problems for instance), the Arab audiences fit themselves and could relate to the Korean sociocultural values as they seem appealing to them. So Korean dramas play the role of an equilibrium point where two, somehow, different cultures could create a new cultural space where these two cultures could meet.

As per Spotify data, Middle East & North African region has shown 140% increase in K-pop consumption between January 2020 to January 2021. In the region, Saudi Arabia, the United Arab Emirates, Morocco, Egypt and Qatar became the top five nations that stream K-pop the most. With Saudi Arabia trying to diversify the economy from oil to culture under Mohammed bin Salman, the country is hosting more KCON events. Lack of nudity and obscene lyrics helped K-pop flourish in ultraconservative Arab societies where Wahhabism is the state religion. Hallyu is also helping the region consolidate their diplomatic links with South Korea and get a progressive makeover to appeal tourists and foreign investors.

Egypt 
Autumn in My Heart, one of the earliest Korean dramas brought over to the Middle East, was made available for viewing after five months of "persistent negotiations" between the South Korean embassy and an Egyptian state-run broadcasting company. Shortly after the series ended, the embassy reported that it had received over 400 phone calls and love letters from fans from all over the country. According to the secretary of the South Korean embassy in Cairo Lee Ki-seok, Korea's involvement in the Iraq War had significantly undermined its reputation among Egyptians, but the screening of Autumn in My Heart proved "extremely effective" in reversing negative attitudes.

In 2020 as per Spotify streaming data, Egypt became the fastest growth market globally for Kpop. As per Alaa Mansour, assistant lecturer at Ain Shams University who worked at Korean Cultural Center, the rise of Korean Wave through Kpop and Kdrama in Egypt made Korean language learning popular among younger generation especially girls.

Iran 

Iran's state broadcaster, Islamic Republic of Iran Broadcasting (IRIB), aired several Korean dramas during prime time slots in recent years, with this decision attributed by some to their Confucian values of respect for others, which are "closely aligned to Islamic culture", while in contrast, Western productions often fail to satisfy the criteria set by Iran's Ministry of Culture and Islamic Guidance. In October 2012, the Tehran Times reported that IRIB representatives visited South Korea to visit filming locations in an effort to strengthen "cultural affinities" between the two countries and to seek avenues for further cooperation between KBS and IRIB.

According to Reuters, until recently audiences in Iran have had little choice in broadcast material and thus programs that are aired by IRIB often attain higher viewership ratings in Iran than in South Korea; for example, the most popular episodes of Jumong attracted over 90% of Iranian audience (compared to 40% in South Korea), propelling its lead actor Song Il-gook to superstar status in Iran.

Iraq 

In the early 2000s, Korean dramas were aired for South Korean troops stationed in northern Iraq as part of coalition forces led by the United States during the Iraq War. With the end of the war and the subsequent withdrawal of South Korean military personnel from the country, efforts were made to expand availability of K-dramas to the ordinary citizens of Iraq.

In 2012, the Korean drama Hur Jun reportedly attained a viewership of over 90% in the Kurdistan region of Iraq. Its lead actor Jun Kwang-ryul was invited by the federal government of Iraq to visit the city of Sulaymaniyah in Kurdistan, at the special request of the country's First Lady, Hero Ibrahim Ahmed.

Morocco 
In December 2013, Morocco's Marrakech International Film Festival, the largest film event in the Middle East and Africa, opened with Korean percussion music samulnori performance and screened more than 40 Korean movies, including Painted Fire (취화선) by director Im Kwon-Taek.

In 2015, Kpop group called Maze won and represented Morocco in Changwon K-pop World Festival. Morocco also became a popular shooting destination for many Kpop and Kdrama that include songs like Stay from Taeyeon, Treasure from Ateez and 2019 series Vagabond which included Moroccan actor Kamal Kadimi.

Israel and Palestinian territories 
In 2006, the Korean drama My Lovely Sam Soon was aired on Israeli cable channel Viva. Despite a lukewarm response, there followed a surge in interest in Korean television shows, and a further thirty Korean dramas were broadcast on the same channel.

It is hoped by some commentators that the surging popularity of Korean culture across Israel and Palestine may serve as a bridge over the Israeli–Palestinian conflict. The Hebrew University of Jerusalem reported that some Israeli and Palestinian K-pop fans see themselves as "cultural missionaries" and actively introduce K-pop to their friends and relatives, further spreading the Korean Wave within their communities.

UAE 
Netflix made K-drama immensely popular in UAE which proved to be a successful genre to increase its subscriber base. The Korean Wave also led to the setting up of many specialized business such as K Girls Closet and Chicsta in UAE that sell Korean Wave merchandise like spicy Korean ramyeon and K-beauty products. In recent times, Korean family-run restaurants started opening up as demand for Korean food skyrocketed. The growing demand helped Nene Chicken open its first Middle Eastern franchise in Dubai.

Oceania

Australia 
In March 2012, former Australian Prime Minister Julia Gillard visited South Korea's Yonsei University, where she acknowledged that her country has "caught" the Korean Wave that is "reaching all the way to our shores."

New Zealand 
In November 2012, New Zealand's Deputy Secretary of the Ministry of Foreign Affairs, Andrea Smith, delivered a key note address to South Korean diplomats at the University of Auckland, where she asserted that the Korean Wave is becoming "part of the Kiwi lifestyle" and added that "there is now a 4,000 strong association of K-pop followers in New Zealand."

Europe

Romania 
The first Korean drama in Romania was aired on TVR in August 2009, and in the following month it became the third most popular television program in the country. Since then, Korean dramas have seen high ratings and further success.

Turkey 

In 1992, MBC sold Eyes of Dawn to the Turkish Radio and Television Corporation, becoming the first Korean drama exported to a European country.

In February 2012, JYJ member Jaejoong was invited by the South Korean Embassy in Ankara to hold an autograph session at Ankara University. Before departing for concerts in South America, Jaejoong also attended a state dinner with the presidents of South Korea (Lee Myung-bak) and Turkey (Abdullah Gül).

France 
The French Foreign Ministry acknowledges the status of Hallyu as a global phenomenon that is characterized by the "growing worldwide success of Korean popular culture".

United Kingdom 
In November 2012, the British Minister of State for the Foreign Office, Hugo Swire, held a meeting with South Korean diplomats at the House of Lords, where he affirmed that Korean music had gone "global". 

According to trend expert Brenda Gabriel, during the Covid-19 lockdown, people started spending more time consuming Korean content. BTS broke the record of most Top 10 hits by any K-pop artist in UK Singles Chart by May, 2021. The first contact with Hallyu happened through Psy's Gangnam Style which topped the music chart in the country in 2021. Great production value, high visual quality and modest video girls are some of the reasons to peak interest in K-pop. In 2019, BTS topped the national music charts in UK and sold out two shows at Wembley Stadium within minutes.

With large number of Korean students studying in UK and influence of Hallyu led to the growth in Korean restaurants outside of major cities such as London.

Duolingo reported 76 percent rise of Korean language learners in UK after the release of Netflix original Squid Game. Around 7.62 million people in UK are learning Korean making the nation tenth largest market for Korean language education.

The rising interest in K-pop and K-drama has led to large number of British university students wanting to get degrees in the Korean language.

North America

Canada
Korean music and drama is popular in Canada, not just due to Korean communities, but as several K-pop idols had grown up in Canada.

United States

During a bilateral meeting with South Korean President Park Geun-hye at the White House in May 2013, US President Barack Obama cited "Gangnam Style" as an example of how people around the world are being "swept up by Korean culture – the Korean Wave." In August 2013, US Secretary of State John Kerry also affirmed that the Korean Wave "spreads Korean culture to countries near and far."

Standout acts such as BTS became the first non-English acts in the MTV music awards and the Grammy's during which they became the first non-English group to receive a nomination.

In May 2022, US President Joe Biden welcomed the members of BTS at the White House.

South America

Argentina 
On 8 October 2021, Argentine Senate declared November 22 as National Kimchi Day which will be celebrated every year. Based on Twitter trends, Argentine is now the second most engaged community with Squid Game in the world. BTS is the most popular K-pop band in the country. Korean beauty products and facemask are getting popular among women in Argentina. With Hallyu, the influence of Korean expatriate community is growing in the country. It also contributed in building a positive image of South Korea as friend of Argentina.

United Nations 

On 30 October 2012, U.N. Secretary-General Ban Ki-moon delivered a speech in front of the National Assembly of South Korea where he noted how Korean culture and the Hallyu-wave is "making its mark on the world".

During a bilateral meet in May 2021, US president Joe Biden in the presence of South Korean president Moon Jae-in acknowledged that "K-pop fans are universal" while speaking about close ties between people of United States and South Korea.

Impact

Sociocultural 
The Korean Wave has spread the influence of aspects of Korean culture including fashion, music, television programs and formats, cosmetics, games, cuisine, manhwa and beauty standards. In China, many broadcasters have taken influences from Korean entertainment programs such as Running Man. In 2014, SBS announced the Chinese version of this program, Hurry Up, Brother, which was a major hit as an example of a unique category of programs known as 'urban action varieties'. Korean media has also been influential throughout Asia in terms of beauty standards. In Taiwan, where the drama Dae Jang Geum was extremely popular, some fans reportedly underwent cosmetic surgery to look similar to lead actress Lee Young-ae.

From July to September 2006, historical dramas such as Emperor of the Sea and Dae Jang Geum were introduced by Doordarshan. In 2007, the Chongdong theater group performance was jointly co-hosted by the South Korean Embassy in India and the Indian Council for Cultural Relations (ICCR). It received positive reception with a jam-packed auditorium and cheering crowds all across India.

More people in India are now eager to learn Korean, enjoy Korean food and visit South Korea for tourism. Social commerce on Instagram flourished with Korean beauty products. Korean literature became popular among the millennial and post-millennial generations thanks to the Literature Translation Institute of Korea and the quarterly magazine Korean Literature Now. Duolingo reported constant rise of Korean learners in India from mere 11% during October 2019 to February 2020 that shot up to 256% from March to October 2020.

As per the 2020 end of the year report published by Duolingo, Korean became the second fastest growing language on the platform and the seventh most popular language of study due to the growing popularity of the Korean Wave around the world; it has grown to become the platform's most popular language course taken in Bhutan, Brunei, Myanmar, and the Philippines as of 2020, up from a single country only (Brunei) in its previous year.
The United States Modern Language Association found university students in the country opting for Korean has been doubled from 2006 to 2016. From 13 King Sejong Institutes till 2007, it has now increased to 213 branches across 76 countries. Korean also became the fastest growing foreign language in Mexico and United States in 2020. The generation born after 1997 are the major demographic attracted to Korean Wave that helped growing influence of Korean soft power around the world. As per King Sejong Institute, more students in India are now applying for Korean language course and Test of Proficiency in Korean due to Hallyu and foreign direct investment from South Korea. The South Korean Ministry of Education attributed this rise in interest in the Korean language as a product of the Korean Wave.

Indian Millennials and Generation Z are showing more affinity towards Hallyu. They are able to absorb popular Korean attributes due to cultural similarities found in habit, behavior, manners, food, words and their syllables. Teenagers are becoming the fastest growing consumer of Hallyu. With growing demand for the language, KCCI raised its student intake capacity 14 times from 300 to 4,200 while also expanding Korean education programs in the country with the Central Board of Secondary Education.

Political and economic 

A 2018–2019 survey conducted by the Korean Culture and Information Service found that the Korean Wave was a key factor in global perceptions of South Korea.

Korean producers have capitalized on high demand in Asia due to the popularity of Korean media, which enabled KBS to sell its 2006 drama Spring Waltz to eight Asian countries during its pre-production stage in 2004.

The following data is based on government statistics:

The following data is from the Korea Creative Contents Agency (part of the Korean Ministry of Culture, Sports, and Tourism) for the first quarter of the 2012 fiscal year:

As per the Korea Customs Service (KCS), there is a 29.3% increase in exports of Korean ramyeon instant noodles that hit the record of US$603 million. It is now four times greater than the largest food export item kimchi. China, the United States, Japan, Thailand and the Philippines are the five largest importing markets for the product. As per South Korean food and beverage company Nongshim, its factory in China and the United States are running in full capacity to fulfill the demand of export orders in 2021. In 2018, Chinese citizens selected ramyeon as the South Korean luxury product of the year. The year 2020 saw the maximum increase in sales of ramyeon in the United States due to K-pop boy band BTS and Academy Award-winning movie Parasite. Due to the rise of Mukbang videos created by Korean internet users on YouTube, product sales of samyang, especially its fire noodle variety, saw major growth in sales around the world.

Japanese brand Nissin Foods launched Korean spicy flavor Geki noodles to capture the Hallyu popular culture in the country. In FY21, India imported ₹55 million worth of soju from South Korea, as per data from the Ministry of Commerce and Industry (MCI). By Q3 FY22, the import value already stands at ₹41 million showing steady growth rate. Hallyu made Soju drinking culture popular in urban cities of India.

Hallyu made Korean snacks popular in Kazakhstan, Pakistan, Russia and the US. Choco pie became the best selling product in China and Vietnam, while Lotte Confectionary captured 90% of India's pie segment. Sales of Pepero abroad reached ₩18.5 billion in 2021 with 20.1% annual growth. Korean brands are also trying to localize flavors based on market demand in China and India.

Relations with North Korea 

In North Korea, the term associated with the Korean Wave is nam-Joseon baram ). In June 2007, the film Hwang Jin Yi, adapted from a novel by a North Korean author, became the first South Korean production to be made available for public viewing in North Korea.

A report published by Radio Free Asia (a non-profit radio network funded by the US federal government) suggested that the Korean Wave "may already have taken a strong hold in the isolated Stalinist state".

In 2010, researchers from the Korea Institute for National Unification surveyed 33 North Korean defectors and found that the impact of shows such as Winter Sonata had played a significant role in shaping the decision of the defectors to flee to the South. It was further revealed that a small number of people living close to the Korean Demilitarized Zone have been tampering with their television sets to receive signals from South Korean broadcast stations in the vicinity, while CDs and DVDs smuggled across the border with China also increased the reach of South Korean popular culture in the North. In 2012, the Institute surveyed a larger group of 100 North Korean defectors. According to this research, South Korean media was prevalent within the North Korean elite. It also affirmed that North Koreans living close to the border with China had the highest degree of access to South Korean entertainment, as opposed to other areas of the country. Notels, Chinese-made portable media players that have been popular in North Korea since 2005, have been credited with contributing to the spread of the Hallyu wave in the Northern country.

In October 2012, Supreme Leader of North Korea Kim Jong-un gave a speech to the Korean People's Army in which he vowed to "extend the fight against the enemy's ideological and cultural infiltration." A study conducted earlier that year by an international group commissioned by the US Department of State came to the conclusion that North Korea was "increasingly anxious" to keep the flow of information at bay, but had little ability to control it, as there was "substantial demand" for movies and television programs from the South as well as many "intensely entrepreneurial" smugglers from the Chinese side of the border willing to fulfill the demand.

On 15 May 2013, the NGO Human Rights Watch confirmed that "entertainment shows from South Korea are particularly popular and have served to undermine the North Korean government's negative portrayals of South Korea".

In 2021, Kim Jong-un and the Korean Central News Agency, the state news agency of North Korea, called K-pop as vicious cancer that should not left unchecked. North Korea has enacted a law in December 2020 that put 15 years of hard labour as punishment for people who were caught watching South Korean entertainment content. Rodong Sinmun warned the authorities that capitalist tendencies coming from South Korea is affecting the ideological and mental state of younger generation that will destroy North Korea. Kim Jong-un termed North Korean women who call their date as oppa instead of comrade perverted. As punishment, those who were caught will be forced to leave cities. The government even urged citizens to report on those who smuggle or watch South Korean content.

Tourism 

South Korea's tourism industry has been greatly influenced by the increasing popularity of its media. According to the Korea Tourism Organization (KTO), monthly tourist numbers have increased from 311,883 in March 1996 to 1,389,399 in March 2016.

The Korean Tourism Organization recognizes K-pop and other aspects of the Korean Wave as pull factors for tourists, and launched a campaign in 2014 entitled "Imagine your Korea", which highlighted Korean entertainment as an important part of tourism. According to a KTO survey of 3,775 K-pop fans in France, 9 in 10 said they wished to visit Korea, while more than 75 percent answered that they were actually planning to go. In 2012, Korean entertainment agency S.M. Entertainment expanded into the travel sector, providing travel packages for those wanting to travel to Korea to attend concerts of artists signed under its label.

Many fans of Korean television dramas are also motivated to travel to Korea, sometimes to visit filming locations such as Nami Island, where Winter Sonata was shot and where there were over 270,000 visitors in 2005, or Dae Jang Geum Theme Park. The majority of these tourists are female.

As per Korea Tourism Organization (KTO) data, more than 100,000 Indians started traveling to South Korea from 2018 which saw an annual average growth rate of 10–15%. KTO registered 36% growth till December 2019 for outbound Indian tourist visiting South Korea.

Study conducted by Hanyang University found that 84.2% of Africans are more inclined to visit the locations where Korean movies and soap operas were shot.

As per KTO, India became one of the top consumer of Korean Wave and it is influencing the lifestyle, urban culture and street style of the country.

Criticism 
In parts of China, Japan, and Taiwan, the Korean Wave has been met with backlash and comparisons to cultural imperialism. In China, the Korean Wave has frequently been described as a "cultural invasion" and restrictions have limited the number of Korean TV dramas shown to Chinese audiences.

Existing negative attitudes towards Korean culture may be rooted in nationalism or historical conflicts. The K-pop industry has been criticized for its promotion of sexualized Asian stereotypes.

Mistreatment of artists
The South Korean entertainment industry has been faced with claims of mistreatment towards its musical artists. This issue came to a head when popular boy group TVXQ brought their management company to court over allegations of mistreatment. The artists claimed they had not been paid what they were owed and that their 13-year contracts were far too long. While the court did rule in their favor, allegations of mistreatment of artists are still rampant.

Accusations of cultural appropriation
On their world tour 'Ode to You', members of Seventeen were accused of singing the song "Curry" by Norazo while visiting an Indian restaurant at San Jose, California. Jo Bin of Norazo issued an apology after the incident. For South Asian ethnic groups it became part of culturally-rooted racism which they are facing for many decades in global pop culture.

In July 2020, Sunmi faced backlash in a TikTok video for misrepresenting Indian classical dance with hand gestures and head bobble movements using the Bhangra song "Tunak Tunak Tun" as background music. Sunmi later issued an apology and deleted the video. NCT-U, after releasing the 2020 album NCT 2020 Resonance, was criticized for failing to distinguish between Islamic and Hindu culture after using Imam Husayn Shrine as background and mudras in their dance routine. Starship Entertainment and Ive were criticized for misappropriating Bharatanatyam. The agency later apologized and made changes in performances of the song "Eleven". Nature was criticized for appropriating sacred Bengali bridal makeup.

Actor Ji Chang-wook and Eum Moon Suk mired in controversy after uploading a video on social media wearing dreadlocks and performing comical dance. People from Black community found it racially offensive and insensitive. Professor of Sociology Yoon In-jin from Korea University said, “acceptance of multiculturalism and cultural sensitivity levels of many Koreans are very low. We have lived as monoethnic people and in monoethnic culture for a long time, so we lack in understanding and respecting other cultures. We are insensitive as to how our actions can be seen by others. On the other hand, we react angrily if foreigners belittle Korean culture or people.” To prevent these controversies, many agencies are educating artists about racial and gender discrimination. They are also banned from giving personal opinions on political, social and historical matters. Agencies who are managing bigger K-pop idols started creating manuals for artists on cultural taboos and politically sensitive topics before going for world tours.

Cultural and moral opposition
K-pop boy bands and their fans have been the targets of a variety of racist, misogynistic, and homophobic attacks purporting that the bands promote homosexuality and feminine men. In February 2021, Matthias Matuschik, a radio presenter for the German radio station Bayern 3, came under attack for declaring BTS were "some crappy virus that hopefully there will be a vaccine for soon." On 1 September 2021, a billboard of Jungkook from BTS was taken down in Pakistan after the billboard purportedly received complaints for promoting homosexuality and using the word ARMY, in conflict with the Pakistan Army. In November 2021, group calling themselves "Team Copyright" based in Bangladesh took down a number of Twitter accounts associated with the BTS fandom through false copyright claims for the band's "promotion of atheism and homosexuality." 

In January 2021, Sowon, a member of the K-pop group GFriend apologized for posting pictures on Instagram with a mannequin dressed as a Nazi soldier. Later that year, on 23 November 2021, the K-pop group Purple Kiss apologized for wearing a hat with the Nazi eagle in a promotional photo.

The Korean reality television dating program Single's Inferno has been criticized for the colorism after participants expressed preference for pale skin. Colorism and beauty standards that prefer paler skin originated from historical distinctions in South Korea between darker-skinned field laborers and the lighter-skinned aristocratic class.

The Minister of Foreign Affiars of Suriname, Albert Ramdin expressed dissatisfaction with the crime K-drama Suriname for its negative depictions of the country. The Minister stated that Suriname has been trying to move past perceptions of it as a narco-state and that the television program presents false image of the country.

In July 2022, the Vietnamese government banned the crime action film The Roundup for containing too many violent scenes, though it was alleged that the ban was a result of the film's negative depictions of Ho Chi Minh City. Later that year, on 5 October, the Vietnamese Ministry of Information and Communications requested Netflix to remove the thriller series Little Women from its library for violating laws prohibiting inaccurate statements on the Vietnam War. In response, Studio Dragon released a statement stating that they would be more attentive of foreign histories and cultural sensitivities in the future.

Philippines 
In the Philippines, director Erik Matti posted on his Twitter account that Filipino TV series and movies are doomed in the future because of K-dramas, stating that Korean actors are "whiter than white" and the stories are "all about love in the midst of this pandemic." German-Filipina singer and former beauty queen Imelda Schweighart expressed her dislike for K-pop, lamenting that Filipinos are losing their identity trying to be like South Koreans. Despite receiving online backlash, Schweighart believes the issue is an eye-opener for all Filipinos, stating that not everyone loves K-pop, "media providers shouldn't just be supporting something just because they have a lot of fans." She added that Filipinos tune to K-dramas and K-pop because "they don't have variety. We don't honor creativity here. We just keep on doing the same thing over and over again. And I'm sick of it. And some people are sick of it as well." Senator Jinggoy Estrada thinks about the idea of banning all Korean dramas and movies in the Philippines: "My observation is if we continue showing Korean telenovelas, our citizens praise the Koreans while Filipino artists continue losing jobs and money. So sometimes it comes to my mind that we should ban the telenovelas of the foreigners, and the Filipino artists who have great talent in acting are what we should be showing in our own country." Moreover, Duterte supporter Mark Lopez on Twitter said that "Korean dramas are strong because Pinoy telenovelas are weak." Estrada clarified that he was only frustrated "that while we are only too eager and willing to celebrate South Korea's entertainment industry, we have sadly allowed our own to deteriorate because of the lack of support from the moviegoing public."

Japan
In Japan, an anti-Korean comic, Manga Kenkanryu ("Hating the Korean Wave") was published on 26 July 2005, and became a No. 1 bestseller on the Amazon Japan site. On 8 August 2011, Japanese actor Sousuke Takaoka openly showed his dislike for the Korean Wave on Twitter, which triggered an Internet movement to boycott Korean programs on Japanese television. Anti-Korean sentiment also surfaced when Kim Tae-hee, a Korean actress, was selected to be on a Japanese soap opera in 2011; since she had been an activist in the Liancourt Rocks dispute for the Dokdo movement in Korea, some Japanese people were enraged that she would be on the Japanese TV show. There was a protest against Kim Tae-hee in Japan, which later turned into a protest against the Korean Wave. According to a Korea Times article posted in February 2014, "Experts and observers in Korea and Japan say while attendance at the rallies is still small and such extreme actions are far from entering the mainstream of Japanese politics, the hostile demonstrations have grown in size and frequency in recent months."

See also 

 Korean diaspora
 Korean studies
 Asian Century
 Cool Japan
 Taiwanese wave
 British Invasion
 Uruguayan Invasion
 History of South Korea
 Miracle on the Han River
 Tourism in South Korea
 Korean Cultural Center
 Korean Culture and Information Service
 Presidential Council on Nation Branding
 Korean literature
 Literature Translation Institute of Korea
 Cinema of Korea
 Hallyuwood
 South Korean animation
 Music of Korea
 Korean hip hop
 Korean rock
 Cultural technology
 List of K-pop artists
 List of South Korean idol groups
 List of K-pop concerts held outside Asia
 Traditional Korean musical instruments
 Korean dance

References 

Articles containing video clips
Exceptionalism
Fandom
Korean nationalism
Social movements in South Korea
South Korean popular culture
South Korean youth culture